In enzymology, an ornithine racemase is an enzyme that catalyzes the chemical reaction

L-ornithine  D-ornithine

Hence, this enzyme has one substrate, L-ornithine, and one product, D-ornithine.

This enzyme belongs to the family of isomerases, specifically those racemases and epimerases acting on amino acids and derivatives.  The systematic name of this enzyme class is ornithine racemase. This enzyme participates in d-arginine and d-ornithine metabolism.

References

 

EC 5.1.1
Enzymes of unknown structure